Bulgaria competed at the 2014 Summer Youth Olympics, in Nanjing, China from 16 August to 28 August 2014.

Medalists
Medals awarded to participants of mixed-NOC (Combined) teams are represented in italics. These medals are not counted towards the individual NOC medal tally.

Archery

Bulgaria qualified a male and female archer from its performance at the 2013 World Archery Youth Championships.

Individual

Team

Athletics

Bulgaria qualified one athlete.

Qualification Legend: Q=Final A (medal); qB=Final B (non-medal); qC=Final C (non-medal); qD=Final D (non-medal); qE=Final E (non-medal)

Boys
Track & road events

Badminton

Bulgaria qualified two athletes based on the 2 May 2014 BWF Junior World Rankings.

Singles

Doubles

Boxing

Bulgaria qualified three boxers based on its performance at the 2014 AIBA Youth World Championships

Boys

Gymnastics

Artistic Gymnastics

Bulgaria qualified one athlete based on its performance at the 2014 European MAG Championships.

Boys

Rhythmic Gymnastics

Bulgaria qualified one individual and one team based on its performance at the 2014 Rhythmic Gymnastics Grand Prix in Moscow.

Individual

Team

Notes: Q=Qualified to Final; R=Reserve

Judo

Bulgaria qualified two athletes based on its performance at the 2013 Cadet World Judo Championships.

Individual

Team

Modern Pentathlon

Bulgaria qualified one athlete based on the 1 June 2014 Olympic Youth A Pentathlon World Rankings.

Rowing

Bulgaria qualified one boat based on its performance at the 2013 World Rowing Junior Championships.

Qualification Legend: FA=Final A (medal); FB=Final B (non-medal); FC=Final C (non-medal); FD=Final D (non-medal); SA/B=Semifinals A/B; SC/D=Semifinals C/D; R=Repechage

Sailing

Bulgaria was given a reallocation boat based on being a top ranked nation not yet qualified.

Shooting

Bulgaria qualified two shooters based on its performance at the 2014 European Shooting Championships.

Individual

Team

Swimming

Bulgaria qualified two swimmers.

Boys

Girls

Weightlifting

Bulgaria qualified 1 quota in the boys' and girls' events based on the team ranking after the 2014 Weightlifting Youth European Championships.

Boys

Girls

Wrestling

Bulgaria qualified one athlete based on its performance at the 2014 European Cadet Championships.

Boys

References

2014 in Bulgarian sport
Nations at the 2014 Summer Youth Olympics
Bulgaria at the Youth Olympics